Sileby Wesleyan Methodist Church is a former Methodist church in Sileby, Leicestershire.

History
Methodism in Sileby started around 1791 when a cottage was purchased for around £70 and converted into a chapel. In 1881 the congregation was in need of a new building.  This was erected in High Street at a cost of £2,000 and presented to the Wesleyan Methodist Connexion at Sileby by Thomas Caloe of Mill Villa on 3 December 1884.

In 1969 the congregation decided to close the church and moved to join Sileby Primitive Methodist Church on King Street.

Organ
A pipe organ by Taylor of Leicester was installed in 1885. On closure of the chapel, the organ was moved to All Saints’ Church, Cossington and then in 2012 exported to Italy.

References

Sileby
Sileby